Colonel Claud Thomas Bourchier (22 April 1831 – 19 November 1877) was an English recipient of the Victoria Cross, the highest and most prestigious award for gallantry in the face of the enemy that can be awarded to British and Commonwealth forces.

He was 23 years old, and a lieutenant in the 1st Battalion, The Rifle Brigade (Prince Consort's Own), British Army during the Crimean War when the following deed took place for which he was awarded the VC.

Action
On 20 November 1854 at Sebastopol, Crimea, Lieutenant Bourchier, with another lieutenant (William James Montgomery Cuninghame) was with a party detailed to drive the Russians from some rifle pits. Advancing on the pits after dark they launched a surprise attack and drove the Russian riflemen from their cover, but in the fierce fighting which ensued the officer in command of the party was killed. The two lieutenants, however, maintained their advantage, withstood all attacks from the enemy during the night and held the position until relieved next day.

He later achieved the rank of colonel. In later life he was a member of Boodle's club in St James's, London.

His Victoria Cross is displayed at the Royal Green Jackets (Rifles) Museum, Winchester, England.

References

Monuments to Courage (David Harvey, 1999)
The Register of the Victoria Cross (This England, 1997)
Scotland's Forgotten Valour (Graham Ross, 1995)

External links
Location of grave and VC medal (Norfolk)

1831 births
1877 deaths
People from North Devon (district)
Rifle Brigade officers
Crimean War recipients of the Victoria Cross
British recipients of the Victoria Cross
British Army personnel of the Crimean War
British military personnel of the Indian Rebellion of 1857
Chevaliers of the Légion d'honneur
British Army recipients of the Victoria Cross